Toril Hetland Akerhaugen (born 5 March 1982) is a Norwegian footballer who played for Stabæk and the Norway women's national football team.  She is a central defender.

Akerhaugen played for Asker FK in the top Norwegian league, the Toppserien until at the end of 2008 the club encountered financial trouble and left the Toppserien.  The club's players then joined a newly formed women's team within Stabæk.  Stabæk's women finished second in the Toppserien in 2009 and 2011 and won the league title in 2010.  In September 2011 Akerhaugen played in the UEFA Women's Champions League in the club's tie against FFC Frankfurt, in which Stabæk won their match in Oslo but lost the return match in Germany a week later. In November 2011 Stabæk won the Norwegian Cup Final.

She played 16 matches for Norway's Under-21 team between 2002 and 2006, and three matches for Norway's senior national team in 2006.  She became a regular player in the national team in 2009 and was selected in the squad for UEFA Women's Euro 2009.

Akerhaugen was named in Norway's squad for UEFA Women's Euro 2013 by veteran coach Even Pellerud. She played in the final at Friends Arena, which Norway lost 1–0 to Germany.

References

External links

 Profile at club site
 National team statistics

1982 births
Living people
Norway women's international footballers
Norwegian women's footballers
Stabæk Fotball Kvinner players
Asker Fotball (women) players
Toppserien players
Women's association football defenders
Footballers from Oslo